Dark Inclusion (also known as Dark Diamond) is a 2016 drama film directed by Arthur Harari and starring Niels Schneider and August Diehl. It tells the story of an aimless young man who decides he must avenge the wrong done to his father by his wealthy uncle, a diamond dealer in Antwerp, but his plan is not as clever as he thinks and after three of his helpers have been killed he ends up even more alienated.

Plot
Pier Ullman works at odd jobs and also does some break-ins with Kevin for Rachid. One day he is informed of the death of his father about who he had no news for several years. He decides to avenge his father who had been mistreated by Pier's grandfather and uncle. He makes contact with his father's family and works his way into their diamond business in Antwerp.

Cast

Accolades

References

External links 
 

2016 films
2016 drama films
2010s French-language films
French drama films
Belgian drama films
Canadian drama films
Films set in Antwerp
French films about revenge
Belgian films about revenge
Canadian films about revenge
2016 directorial debut films
French-language Belgian films
French-language Canadian films
2010s Canadian films
2010s French films